Grilstone in the parish of Bishop's Nympton in north Devon, England, is an historic estate. The present grade II listed house, situated about 1 1/4 miles south-east of the market town of South Molton, is Georgian, an 1834 extension and remodelling by Rev. William Thorne of an earlier building.

It is best known as the seat of Sir Lewis Pollard (c. 1465 – 1526), Justice of the Common Pleas from 1514 to 1526 and a Member of Parliament for Totnes in 1491.

History

de Grilstone
The earliest recorded holder of the estate, in the 13th and 14th centuries, was the de Grilstone family, which as was usual took its name from its seat. In 1374 a member of the family obtained from the Bishop of Exeter a licence to have a chapel on the site.

Pollard
The Pollard family had originated at the manor of Way in the parish of St Giles in the Wood, near Great Torrington, Devon, called by Hoskins (1954) "the fons et origo  of the mighty tribe of Pollard". The present house is a grade II listed building.

Sir Lewis Pollard (died 1526) later moved to King's Nympton where he purchased the manor which remained the seat of his descendants, the Pollard baronets, until it was sold by Sir Hugh Pollard, 2nd Baronet (1603–1666). On his death without a son the baronetcy passed to his younger brother Sir Amyas Pollard, 3rd Baronet (1616–1701), of Abbots Bickington, Devon, who died unmarried and without legitimate male heir, when the baronetcy became extinct.

Jutsum
The Jutsum family lived at Grilstone in the 19th century, where Frederick Jutsum kept a well-regarded herd of Red Devon Cattle.

Passmore
The Passmore family inherited Grilstone, on the marriage of Edmund Passmore to Lydia Jutsum, heiress of Grilstone. Bertha Passmore was the mother of the judge John Widgery, 1st Baron Widgery (1911–1981), Lord Chief Justice of England and Wales (1971–80), whose father's family was from South Molton.

Notes

References

Sources
Hoskins, W.G., A New Survey of England: Devon, Newton Abbot: David & Charles. New edition, 1972. 

Historic estates in Devon